Kovalam Football Club (often abbreviated as Kovalam FC) is an Indian professional football club based in Kovalam, neighbourhood of Thiruvananthapuram District, Kerala. They compete in the Kerala Premier League.

History 
Kovalam Football Club was founded in 2009 by Ebin Rose, a former Santhosh Trophy player for Kerala, and PJ Mathew, an ex-army personnel and footballer. The club holds the unique distinction of being the first team from Kerala playing under-15 I-League. They first participated in 2018-19 KPL, since then they are an integral part of Kerala Premier League.  It is also the first club from the state to have its own football specific stadium and residential academy.

Milestones 

 2009 Starts the club
 2012 Starts the academy
 2014 First Kerala club to receive academy accreditation
 2015 First Kerala club to play in U15 I-League
 2018 Foundations for residential academy
 2018 Participated in Kerala Premier League
 2019 Builds football stadium and hostel
 2020 Beats Kerala Blasters in KPL
 2020 Fully-functional residential academy

Jersey sponsors

Stadium 
Kovalam FC has its own stadium behind the M. V. Higher Secondary School, Arumanoor.

Squad

References 

Football clubs in Kerala
Kerala Premier League